Events from the year 1998 in the United Kingdom.

Incumbents
Monarch – Elizabeth II
Prime Minister – Tony Blair (Labour)
Parliament – 52nd

Events

January
 5 January – The UK takes over the Presidency of the EC's Council of Ministers until 30 June.

February
 3 February – Stamps commemorating the late Diana, Princess of Wales, go on sale across the UK.
 7–22 February – Great Britain and Northern Ireland compete at the Winter Olympics in Nagano, Japan, and win one bronze medal.
 12 February – Mohamed Al Fayed, the father of Dodi Fayed, says that he is "99.9% certain" that his son's death in the car crash that also claimed the life of Diana, Princess of Wales on 31 August 1997 was a conspiracy to kill rather than an accident. He also claims that his son had purchased an engagement ring just before the crash and had been preparing to propose marriage to Diana. A lawyer in Mr Al Fayed's native Egypt was planning to sue the Queen and UK Prime Minister Tony Blair on the grounds that they had conspired to kill Diana because her love for a Muslim would embarrass the country.
 28 February – Lancet MMR autism fraud: A study by Andrew Wakefield published in The Lancet suggests a link between MMR vaccine and autism; although subsequently discredited and retracted, it is widely influential on vaccination rates.

March
 6 March – Closure of South Crofty, the last working tin mine in Cornwall.
 31 March – The Rolls-Royce Motors brand is acquired by German car manufacturer BMW.

April
 April – Vauxhall launches its fourth generation Astra small family car range. The initial range consists of hatchbacks, saloons and estates, with coupe and cabriolet models arriving in two years.
 1 April – The historic counties of Herefordshire and Worcestershire are reestablished, 24 years after they merged to form Hereford and Worcester. Berkshire County Council is abolished and replaced by unitary authorities.
 10 April – The Good Friday Agreement, an agreement between the UK and Irish governments and the main political parties in Northern Ireland is signed.
 27 April – Kevin Lloyd, who played Tosh Lines in The Bill since 1988, is dismissed from the role by ITV due to his alcoholism. He dies, the following week, aged 49.

May
 2 May – Police in Maryland, United States, reveal that they have arrested and bailed former English footballer Justin Fashanu over an allegation of sexual assault against a seventeen-year-old male, and they believe he has now breached his bail conditions and fled the country; he commits suicide in London.
 9 May – The Eurovision Song Contest held in Birmingham at the National Indoor Arena.
 15 May – 24th G8 summit held in Birmingham.
 20 May – Nurses Deborah Parry and Lucille McLauchlan, who had been convicted in Saudi Arabia for the murder of Yvonne Gilford the previous year, have their sentences commuted by the order of King Fahd and are returned to the UK.
 23 May – Referendums on the Good Friday Agreement are held in the Republic of Ireland and Northern Ireland with 95% and 71% support respectively.

June
 June – The DVD format is released onto the UK market for the first time. Among the first set of titles released on the new format is Jumanji. The format will sell just over 6,000 discs by the end of the year.
 15 June – First general-circulation issue of a two pound coin, with a bi-metallic design (dated 1997).
 23 June – The Heathrow Express rail link begins operation.
 27 June – The Diana, Princess of Wales Tribute Concert is held at Althorp Park in Northamptonshire, and attended by 15,000 people.

July
 12 July – Drumcree conflict: Three young children are killed in a loyalist Ulster Volunteer Force arson attack in Ballymoney, Northern Ireland.
 31 July
 Crime and Disorder Act receives Royal Assent. It introduces Anti-Social Behaviour Orders, Sex Offender Orders, Parenting Orders, and 'racially aggravated' offences. It makes it possible for a young person between ten and fourteen to be presumed capable of committing an offence and formally abolishes capital punishment for treason and piracy, the last civilian offences for which the death penalty remained theoretically available.
 The Government of Wales Act 1998, which will establish a devolved Welsh Assembly, receives Royal Assent.
 The government announces a total ban on the use of landmines by the British military.

August
 10 August – Manchester United TV begins broadcasting, making Manchester United F.C. the world's second football team to have its own television channel, the first being Middlesbrough (Boro TV) in 1997.
 15 August – Omagh bombing: A car bomb explodes in the Northern Irish market town of Omagh, County Tyrone, killing 29 people – the worst terrorist atrocity in the history of The Troubles in Northern Ireland. It has been planted by the Real Irish Republican Army.
 18 August – Mathematicians Richard Borcherds and Timothy Gowers are awarded Fields Medals.
 22 August – Reading F.C. move into their new Madejski Stadium, named after chairman John Madejski, near junction 11 of the M4 motorway in the south of Reading. It seats more than 24,000 spectators.
 24 August
 The Netherlands is selected as the venue for the Pan Am Flight 103 bombing trial of two Libyans who are charged with causing the explosion of an aircraft at Lockerbie that killed 270 people in December 1988.
 First RFID human implantation tested in the United Kingdom by Kevin Warwick at the University of Reading.

September
 8 September – The Real IRA announces a ceasefire.
 10 September – In Northern Ireland, David Trimble of the Ulster Unionist Party meets Gerry Adams of Sinn Féin – the first such meeting between Republicans and Loyalists since 1922.
 16 September – The Union Jack dress worn by the Spice Girl Geri Halliwell is sold at Sotheby's for £41,320

October
 October – Ford launches its new Focus range of small family hatchbacks, saloons and estates which will eventually replace the long-running Escort although that model would continue until the year 2000 and the van model lasting until 2002. 
 16 October – Indictment and arrest of Augusto Pinochet: Police place General Augusto Pinochet, the 83-year-old former dictator of Chile, into house arrest during his medical treatment in Britain at the request of Spain.
 27 October – Ron Davies resigns as Secretary of State for Wales, citing "an error of judgement" in agreeing to go for what he said was a meal with a man he had met while walking on Clapham Common in London, which is a well known gay meeting place, and subsequently being mugged.

November
 November – Peugeot launches the 206 supermini which is being built at the Ryton plant near Coventry.
 9 November – Human Rights Act receives Royal Assent.
 24 November – The Queen's Speech announces the government plan to abolish the rights of 700 hereditary peers to sit and vote in the House of Lords; unprecedentedly this is met with audible "hear hears".
 25 November – Appointed Regional development agencies and Regional chambers ("Regional assemblies") in England are created under the Regional Development Agencies Act.
 26 November – Tony Blair becomes the first Prime Minister of the United Kingdom to address the Oireachtas (Irish parliament).

December
 December – The Ford Focus is voted European Car of the Year. 
 10 December
 John Hume and David Trimble win the Nobel Peace Prize.
 John Pople wins the Nobel Prize in Chemistry "for his development of computational methods in quantum chemistry".
 26 December – Great Boxing Day Storm: severe gale-force winds hits Ireland, southern Scotland and northern England. Roads, railways and electricity are disrupted.
 29 December – Three British tourists are among those shot during a gun battle to free them from kidnappers in Yemen.

Date unknown
 The Unmanned Aerial Vehicle Systems Association is created.

Publications
 Beryl Bainbridge's novel Master Georgie.
 Iain M. Banks' novel Inversions.
 Julian Barnes's novel :England, England.
 Ted Hughes's poetry collection Birthday Letters.
 Nigella Lawson's guide How to Eat: the pleasures and principles of good food.
 Ian McEwan's novel Amsterdam.
 John O'Farrell's political memoir Things Can Only Get Better.
 Terry Pratchett's Discworld novels The Last Continent and Carpe Jugulum.
 J. K. Rowling's novel Harry Potter and the Chamber of Secrets.

Births

 2 January 
 George Miller, footballer
 Ollie Pope, cricketer
 4 January – Tia Rigg, murder victim (died 2010)
 18 January – Alfie McIlwain, actor
 2 February – Chris Smith, footballer
 3 February – Zak Crawley, cricketer
 4 February – Scott Jones, athlete
 15 February – George Russell, racing driver
 27 February
 Sam Smith, footballer
 Theo Stevenson, actor
 13 March – Oliver Stokes, actor
 14 March – George Bartlett, cricketer
 24 March – Isabel Suckling, singer
 11 April – Oliver Dillon, actor
 12 April – Tom Pearce, footballer
 14 April – Arthur Bowen, actor
 22 April – Jay Dasilva, footballer
 8 May – Sam Field, footballer
 14 May – Aaron Ramsdale, footballer
 3 June – Sam Curran, cricketer.
 4 June – Jack Blatherwick, cricketer
 7 June – Graham Newberry, American-English figure skater
 10 June – Johnny Bennett, actor
 14 June – Julia Joyce, actress
 21 June – Isabel Atkin, freestyle skier  
 30 June – Tom Davies, footballer
 1 July – Hollie Steel, classical crossover singer
 19 July
Ronaldo Vieira, footballer
Amar Virdi, cricketer
Lil Woods, actress
 20 July – Sinead Michael, actress
 28 July - Sam Surridge, footballer
 2 August – Giarnni Regini-Moran, artistic gymnast
 6 August – Jack Scanlon, actor
 8 August – Ronan Parke, pop singer
 14 August – Amy Marren, swimmer
 5 September – Helena Barlow, actress
 9 September – Shannon Matthews, kidnapping victim 
 21 September – Prem Sisodiya, cricketer
 2 October – Zack Morris, actor
 7 October – Trent Alexander-Arnold, footballer
 17 October – Erin Kellyman, actress
 18 October – Jack Carroll, comic actor
 20 October – Jordan Allan, footballer
 22 October 
 Georgina Anderson, pop singer (died 2013)
 Harry Souttar, footballer
 29 October – Matthew Potts, cricketer
 11 November – Tom Banton, cricketer
 21 November – Will Jacks, cricketer
 28 November – Ronan McKenzie, kart racing driver
 1 December – Ollie Robinson, cricketer
 3 December – Marcus Edwards, footballer
 11 December – Gabz (Gabrielle Gardiner), singer-songwriter
 14 December – Lukas Nmecha, footballer
 17 December – Jasmine Armfield, actress
 24 December – Declan McKenna, pop singer

Deaths

 2 January – Frank Muir, actor, comedy writer and raconteur (born 1920)
 5 January – David Bairstow, English cricketer (born 1951; suicide)
 8 January – Sir Michael Tippett, composer (born 1905)
 13 January – Ian Moores, former footballer (born 1954)
 15 January – James Ashley, suspected heroin dealer (born 1958); murdered
 18 January – Monica Edwards, children's writer (born 1912)
 23 January – Victor Pasmore, artist (born 1908)
 24 January – Xenia Field, councillor, horticulturalist and author (born 1894)
 3 February – Davy Kaye, actor (born 1916)
 8 February – Enoch Powell, politician (born 1912)
 14 February – Edgar Granville, Baron Granville of Eye, politician (born 1898)
 6 March – Benjamin Bowden, designer (born 1906)
 7 March – Bernarr Rainbow, historian of music education, organist, and choir master (born 1941)
 10 March – Ian Dunn, gay and paedophile rights activist, founder of the Scottish Minorities Group (born 1943 )
 13 March – Judge Dread, reggae musician (born 1945) 
 16 March
 Derek Barton, chemist, Nobel Prize laureate (born 1918)
 Noel Stephen Paynter, Royal Air Force commodore (born 1898)
 25 March – Daniel Massey, actor (born 1933)
 3 April – Dame Mary Cartwright, mathematician (born 1900)
 5 April 
 Sir Frederick Charles Frank, physicist (born 1911, South Africa)
 Cozy Powell, rock musician (born 1947)
 11 April – Francis Durbridge, playwright and author (born 1912)
 16 April – Fred Davis, snooker and billiards player (born 1913)
 17 April – Linda McCartney, American-born, British-based photographer and musician (born 1941)
 19 April – Denis Howell, Baron Howell, politician (born 1923)
 20 April 
 Joan Mary Wayne Brown, British author (b. 1906)
 Trevor Huddleston, Anglican bishop and anti-apartheid activist (born 1913)
 2 May
 Justin Fashanu, footballer (born 1961; suicide)
 Kevin Lloyd, actor (born 1949)
 9 May – Bob Mellish, Baron Mellish, politician (born 1913)
 15 May – Patrick Wall, World War II marine commando and politician (born 1916)
 18 May – Enid Marx, artist and designer (born 1902)
 10 June – Hammond Innes, author (born 1914)
 11 June – Catherine Cookson, author (born 1906)
 13 June
 Alfred Horace Gerrard, sculptor (born 1899)
 Kadamba Simmons, actress and model (born 1974); murdered
 Reg Smythe, cartoonist (born 1917)
 22 June – Benny Green, writer, radio broadcaster and saxophonist (b. 1927).
 5 July – Johnny Speight, television scriptwriter (born 1920)
 9 July – Katherine Russell, social worker and university teacher (born 1909)
 11 July – John Boyd-Carpenter, Baron Boyd-Carpenter, politician (born 1908)
 18 July – Betty Marsden, comedy actress (born 1919)
 23 July – John Hopkins, screenwriter (born 1931); accidentally killed in the United States
 25 July – Tiny Rowland, businessman (born 1917)
 27 July – Binnie Barnes, actress (born 1903)
 3 August – Alan Walsh, physicist, developer of atomic absorption spectroscopy (born 1913)
 4 August – Richard Dunn, CEO of Thames Television (born 1943)
 9 August – George Child Villiers, 9th Earl of Jersey, peer (born 1910)
 22 August – Evelyn Denington, Baroness Denington, politician (born 1907)
 2 September – Jackie Blanchflower, footballer (born 1933)
 4 September – Lal Waterson, folk singer-songwriter (born 1943)
 19 September – Ran Laurie, physician and Olympic rowing champion, father of Hugh Laurie (born 1915)
 3 October – Roddy McDowall, actor (born 1928)
 6 October – Joseph J. Sandler, psychoanalyst (born 1927)
 10 October – Jackie Forster, journalist and lesbian rights activist (born 1926)
 17 October – Joan Hickson, actress (born 1906)
 20 October – Frank Gillard, radio broadcaster (born 1909)
 22 October – Eric Ambler, novelist and playwright (born 1909)
 28 October
 Tommy Flowers, electrical engineer (born 1905)
 Ted Hughes, poet laureate and children's writer (born 1930)
 2 November – Janet Arnold, costume designer (born 1932)
 7 November 
 Margaret Gowing, historian (born 1921)
 John Hunt, Baron Hunt, World War II army officer and leader of the 1953 British Mount Everest Expedition (born 1910)
 12 November – Roy Hollis, footballer (born 1925)
 13 November – Doug Wright, English cricketer (b. 1914)
 24 November – John Chadwick, linguist (born 1920)
 29 November – Martin Ruane, British professional wrestler (b. 1947)
 1 December – Freddie Young, cinematographer (born 1902)
 2 December – Brian Stonehouse, painter and World War II secret agent (born 1918)
 7 December – Michael Craze, actor (born 1942)
 13 December – Lew Grade, showbusiness impresario and television company executive (born 1906 in Ukraine)
 20 December – Alan Lloyd Hodgkin, scientist, recipient of the Nobel Prize in Physiology or Medicine (born 1914)
 21 December
 Roger Avon, actor (b. 1914)
 Avril Coleridge-Taylor, pianist, conductor, composer and daughter of Samuel Coleridge-Taylor (born 1903)
 Richard Turnbull, British colonial governor (b. 1909)
 22 December – Donald Soper, Methodist minister and pacifist (born 1903)
 25 December – John Pulman, snooker player (born 1923); accidentally killed
 30 December – George Webb, actor (born 1911)

See also
 List of British films of 1998

References

 
Years of the 20th century in the United Kingdom
United Kingdom